Borja Golán (born 6 January 1983 in Santiago de Compostela) is a professional squash player who represents Spain. He reached a career-high world ranking of World No. 5 in April 2014.

Career overview
In August 2009, in the Colombian Open final, Borja suffered serious injury to his right knee which kept him out of action for six months. He reached the top ten World Ranking the month following the tournament.

About three years later, in 2013, he succeeded to climb back into the top 10. In November, he reached the semi-final of the Qatar Classic winning in quarter-final against the seed No. 1 Grégory Gaultier in a tense and controversial match. And in December, he was runner-up of the Hong Kong Open against Nick Matthew, his first PSA World Series final.

Major World Series final appearances

Hong Kong Open: 1 final (0 title, 1 runner-up)

References

External links 
 
 

1983 births
Living people
Spanish male squash players
Sportspeople from Santiago de Compostela